The 2020 Busch Clash was a NASCAR Cup Series race held on February 9, 2020 at Daytona International Speedway in Daytona Beach, Florida. Contested over 88 laps — extended from 75 laps due to an overtime finish, it was the first exhibition race of the 2020 NASCAR Cup Series season. The race was won by Erik Jones, one of only six cars still running after a series of crashes late in the race, gaining the race the nickname of "Busch Crash" for that reason.

Report

Background

The track, Daytona International Speedway, is one of six superspeedways to hold NASCAR races, the others being Michigan International Speedway, Auto Club Speedway, Indianapolis Motor Speedway, Pocono Raceway, and Talladega Superspeedway. The standard track at Daytona International Speedway is a four–turn superspeedway that is  The track's turns are banked at 31 degrees, while the front stretch, the location of the finish line, is banked at 18 degrees.

Format and eligibility
The race is 75 laps in length, and is divided into two segments; the first is 25 laps and the second is 50 laps. The race is open to those drivers who won a pole in the 2019 season or had won "The Clash" previously.

The 2020 Busch Clash will not be a predetermined number of cars; rather, the field is limited to drivers who meet more exclusive criteria. Only drivers who were 2019 Pole Award winners, former Clash race winners, former Daytona 500 champions, former Daytona 500 pole winners who competed full–time in 2019 and drivers who qualified for the 2019 Playoffs are eligible.

Entry list
Eighteen drivers were confirmed to be participating in this event. Although Daniel Hemric and Daniel Suárez were eligible to run the event, they chose not to run with Hemric moving back to the NASCAR Xfinity Series and Suarez focusing in preparing for the 2020 Daytona 500.

Practice

Starting lineup
The lineup was determined by random draw, with Ryan Newman drawing the top spot.

Race summary

Race Results

Box score

Statistics

Media
FS1 covered the race on the television side; Mike Joy and Jeff Gordon handled the call in the booth for the race; Michael Waltrip,  Vince Welch and Matt Yocum handled pit road for the television side.

Television
A total of 2.46 million people watched the race, which earned it a 1.57 rating. This rating was 15% higher than the 2019 Clash.

Radio

References

Busch Clash
Busch Clash
Busch Clash
NASCAR races at Daytona International Speedway